BnF Français 794 (former shelfmarks Regius 7191.2 and before that Cangé 73) is a mid-13th century French manuscript, and one of only two manuscripts to contain the five romances of Chrétien de Troyes, the other being BnF Français 1450.

The manuscript was transcribed by Guiot de Provins, who identifies himself on fol. 105r. The manuscript has been the subject of many studies, and is the basis for the citations for the Dictionnaire Électronique de Chrétien de Troyes, an online Old French dictionary, Furthermore, it contains copies of the Roman de Troie and Roman de Brut.

Works 

The manuscript contains 11 works

 Li romans d'Erec et d'Enyde (Erec and Enide)
 Li romans de Lancelot de la Charrete (Lancelot, the Knight of the Cart)
 Li romans de Cliges
 Li chevaliers au lyeon (Yvan, the Knight of the Lion)
 D'Atys et Porfilias
 Le Roman de Troie, Benoît de Sainte-Maure
 Les estoires d'Engleterre (Le Roman de Brut, Wace)
 Des empereors de Rome
 Percevax le viel (Perceval, the Story of the Grail)
 First continuation of Perceval
 Second continuation of Perceval, Wauchier de Denain

Notes

References

External links 
 BnF Français 794 on Gallica, the digitized library of the Bibliothèque nationale de France.

13th-century manuscripts
Chrétien de Troyes